Jonathan Ornstein is chairman and chief executive officer of Mesa Air Group, Inc., and was appointed on May 1, 1998. From April 1996 to his joining the company as chief executive officer, Ornstein served as president and chief executive officer and chairman of Virgin Express, a European airline. From 1995 to April 1996, Ornstein served as chief executive officer of Virgin Express Holdings, Inc. Ornstein joined Continental Express as president and chief executive officer in July 1994 and, in November 1994, was named senior vice president, Airport Services at Continental Airlines. Ornstein was previously employed by the company from 1988 to 1994, as executive vice president and as president of the company's WestAir Holding, Inc., subsidiary.

Controversies
In 1978 Ornstein dropped out of the University of Pennsylvania after his junior year and relocated to the Los Angeles area when he was 21 years old. He became a well-recognized broker for the firm E.F. Hutton as the youngest ever to hold a position there. Through the years following he left and accepted offers at other firms, however being terminated from some in the process due to breaching ethical standards such as unauthorized trading, misrepresentation, document alteration and churning. At a later time he was fined $20,000 and unable to be a broker due to suspension for a period of three years.  The S.E.C. case against Ornstein is/was 51 S.E.C. 135, 141 (1992).

References

External links
Official biography

Year of birth missing (living people)
Living people
American airline chief executives